Josef Straßberger (August 20, 1894 – October 10, 1950) was a German weightlifter who competed in two Olympic games in 1928 and 1932. He won the gold medal in the heavyweight division in Amsterdam and the bronze medal in the same division in Los Angeles. He was born in Kolbermoor, Bavaria and died in Munich.

References

External links
Josef Strassberger on Top Olympic Lifters of the 20th Century

1894 births
1950 deaths
People from Kolbermoor
Sportspeople from Upper Bavaria
German male weightlifters
Olympic weightlifters of Germany
Olympic gold medalists for Germany
Olympic bronze medalists for Germany
Weightlifters at the 1928 Summer Olympics
Weightlifters at the 1932 Summer Olympics
Olympic medalists in weightlifting
Medalists at the 1932 Summer Olympics
Medalists at the 1928 Summer Olympics